Interlex Communications, known as simply Interlex, is an American social marketing and advertising company that focuses on social issues such as public health and disaster relief. The company has over 50 employees with offices in Texas, New York, and California. Interlex was ranked on the Inc. 5000 list in 2010 and 2011, and is one of the largest Hispanic-owned marketing agencies.

Heather Ruiz and her husband, Rudy Ruiz, founded Interlex Communications in 1995 as a communications company focused on turning public policy into social action. In 2012, Interlex acquired advertising agency SenaReider based in Monterey, California.

Interlex has worked on social awareness campaigns for TracFone Wireless, AARP, American Express, Del Monte, and public health campaigns for government entities, the American Heart Association, American Cancer Society, and United Healthcare. Internationally, Interlex has worked on human rights and disaster relief campaigns for the Organization of American States and Pan American Development Foundation.5

Interlex Communications is a full-service advertising, marketing, and PR firm with a multicultural focus. It specializes in public sector, nonprofit, and cause-related marketing and has done campaigns for public health, nutrition, cancer awareness and prevention, public education, international tourism and economic development, environmental awareness, and HIV/AIDS prevention. Clients include American Express, CDC, and Departments of Health for various states.

Services

Research
Interlex Communications develop quantitative and qualitative analysis and field to gain perspectives, guide approaches and assess success.

Advertising
Interlex Communications marketing department relies on conventional, interactive and direct response media analysis, preparation, and evaluation methods.

Digital
Interlex Communications design, artistic, marketing, and PR departments operate integrally to optimize the digital reach of consumers.

Public Relations
Interlex Communications combine  clients connections with internet PR, social networking, and blogs.

References

External links
 Interlex USA
 Interlex Services

Marketing companies established in 1995
Advertising agencies of the United States